Manorville may refer to:

Manorville, New York, United States
Manorville, Pennsylvania, United States